Gideon Koegelenberg (born 25 November 1994) is a South African rugby union player for the  in Super Rugby and in the Currie Cup and the  in the Rugby Challenge. He usually plays as a lock.

Rugby career

Youth rugby

He earned inclusion in the 2012 South Africa Schools squad and made appearances against France and England.

Sharks / UKZN Impi

He then joined the  Academy, where he made a single appearances against former side . A knee injury hampered his progress at the Durban-based side, ruling him out of the entire 2014 season.

Golden Lions

Zebre

He then moved to Italy to join Pro12 side Zebre during the 2015–16 season. He played five matches during the 2015–16 season, and a further 12 in the 2016–17 season, starting nine matches and receiving three yellow cards.

Return to Sharks

At the end of the 2017 season, Koegelenberg left Zebre to return to South Africa, and to former side the Sharks, signing a two-year deal with the Durban-based franchise.

Super Rugby statistics

References

South African rugby union players
Living people
1994 births
People from Wellington, Western Cape
Rugby union locks
Sharks (Currie Cup) players
Zebre Parma players
South African expatriate rugby union players
Expatriate rugby union players in Italy
Sharks (rugby union) players
Expatriate rugby union players in Australia
Melbourne Rebels players
Expatriate rugby union players in Japan
Kurita Water Gush Akishima players
Rugby union players from the Western Cape